List of U-boat types contains lists of the German U-boat types (submarine classes) used in World War I and World War II.

The anglicized word U-boat is usually only used as reference for German submarines in the two World Wars and therefore postwar submarine in the Bundesmarine and later German Navy are not included.

In the period between the two World Wars the Reichsmarine of the Weimar Republic was not allowed to build submarines according to the Treaty of Versailles; development was undertaken secretly through a Dutch company NV Ingenieurskantoor voor Scheepsbouw before the mid-1930s. The terms of the Anglo-German naval agreement acknowledged the official building of new U-boats.

World War I 
This list contains the German U-boats types prior or during the First World War.

World War II 
This list contains the German U-boats types prior or during the Second World War.

See also
List of naval ships of Germany
List of naval ship classes of Germany

References

External links
uboat.net - World War I U-boat types
uboat.net - World War II U-boat types

Types
Types
U-boat
U-boat